7055 alloy is heat treatable wrought aluminum alloy. It has high ultimate tensile strength value of 593 MPa.

Chemical Composition

Properties

Applications 

 Aerospace sector
 High strength requirement areas

References

External links 
 Single-aging characteristics of 7055 aluminum alloy
 7055: High-Strength Plate and Extrusion Alloy
 Microstructure characterization of 7055-T6, 6061-T6511 and 7A52-T6 Al alloys subjected to ballistic impact against heavy tungsten alloy projectile
 Grain size prediction and investigation of 7055 aluminum alloy inoculated by Al–5Ti–1B master alloy,Journal of Alloys and Compounds - X-MOL
 ShieldSquare Captcha

Aluminum alloy table 

Aluminium–zinc alloys